A Voluntad del Cielo (Heaven's Will) is 19th studio album recorded by Spanish singer-songwriter Camilo Sesto, It was released by RCA Ariola on October 15, 1991 (see 1991 in music). The album was produced by Sesto and Augusto César and included ten songs written by Sesto. The album was released five years after the self-imposed retirement of the artist in 1986 and includes his first number-one single in the Billboard Top Latin Songs chart, "Amor Mío, ¿Qué Me Has Hecho?".

A Voluntad del Cielo peaked at number two in the Billboard Latin Pop Albums chart, being held from the top of the chart by Amada Más Que Nunca by Mexican singer Daniela Romo.

Track listing
All tracks written and performed by Camilo Blanes.

Chart performance

(C) MCMXCI. RCA Ariola. S.A. de C.V.

References

1991 albums
Camilo Sesto albums
RCA Records albums
Spanish-language albums